Thule Island, also called Morrell Island, is one of the southernmost of the South Sandwich Islands, part of the grouping known as Southern Thule. It is named, on account of its remote location, after the mythical land of Thule, said by ancient geographers to lie at the extreme end of the Earth. The alternative name Morrell Island is after Benjamin Morrell, an American explorer and whaling captain. It was espied by James Cook and his Resolution crew on 31 January 1775 during his attempt to find Terra Australis.

Geography
Mount Larsen is named after the Antarctic explorer and whaler Carl Anton Larsen. On the southwestern end lies Wasp Point. Off Hewison Point lies the small islet of Twitcher Rock, the southernmost land on Earth except for part of Cook Island, Antarctica and offshore islands considered part of Antarctica.

Thule Island is the westernmost of Southern Thule island group, which also encompasses Cook Island and Bellingshausen Island. It is thought that Thule and Cook may have been a larger single island in the past, and there is evidence for a submerged crater between the two. Steam from the summit crater lake and ash on the flank were reported in 1962. Volcanic heat keeps the crater on Thule Island free from ice.

Argentine occupation

Argentina, in order to assert its claim over the South Sandwich Islands, established the summer station Teniente Esquivel at Ferguson Bay on the southeastern coast on January 25, 1955. The station had to be evacuated in January 1956 because of volcanic eruption of Mount Holdgate (so named in 1964) on the neighboring Cook Island to the east. In 1976 it established a military base on Thule Island called Corbeta Uruguay (Port Faraday) in the lee (southern east coast) of the island. The British discovered the presence of the Argentine base the same year but chose to pursue a diplomatic solution to the issue until the breakout of the Falklands War in 1982. The base was occupied by British forces in the aftermath of the war and eventually destroyed later that year.

See also 
 Cape Flannery
 Herd Point
 List of Antarctic and sub-Antarctic islands
 Morrell Point
 Wasp Point

References

Notes

Sources
 
 
 volcano.und.edu

External links

Islands of the South Sandwich Islands
Volcanoes of the Atlantic Ocean
Volcanoes of South Georgia and the South Sandwich Islands
Uninhabited islands of South Georgia and the South Sandwich Islands
Volcanic crater lakes